The Jens Myhre Round Barn near New Rockford, North Dakota, United States, is a round barn that was built in 1919.  It was listed on the National Register of Historic Places in 1986.

According to its National Register nomination, it "is significant for being an extremely intact surviving example of the round barn theme", and "it is the only round barn surviving in the state which employed a ramp to the mow area".  Apparently the ramp method for loading the mow was obsolescent due to advent of hay moving slings and tracks as alternatives;  this ramp "may have been perceived as out of fashion and behind the times."  It has a concrete foundation and wall, which contributes to another paradox in the barn's "apparently conflicting" history.

References

Barns on the National Register of Historic Places in North Dakota
Infrastructure completed in 1919
Round barns in North Dakota
National Register of Historic Places in Eddy County, North Dakota
1919 establishments in North Dakota